Minto was a provincial electoral division in the Canadian province of Manitoba. It was created by redistribution in 1999, and has formally existed since the provincial election of 1999. The riding is located in the centre of the City of Winnipeg.

Minto was created primarily from territory from the old St. James riding, with some additional territory from Wellington as well. In many respects, the riding may be regarded as a successor to the St. James riding which existed before 1999.

Minto was bordered on the east by Point Douglas, to the north by Wellington, to the south by Wolseley, and to the west by the current St. James riding.

The riding's population in 1996 was 20,479.  In 1999, the average family income was $37,037, and the unemployment rate was 13.80%.  Thirty-seven per cent of the riding's residents are listed as low-income, one of the highest rates in the province.  Twenty-two per cent of families in the riding are single-parent.

Minto has an immigrant population of 33%, the highest in the province. Sixteen per cent of the riding's residents are Filipino, 7% Portuguese, 3% Chinese and 2% Italian. The aboriginal population in the riding is 14%.

Manufacturing accounts for 25% of Minto's industry, with a further 19% in the service sector.

List of provincial representatives

Electoral results

Previous boundaries

References

Former provincial electoral districts of Manitoba
Politics of Winnipeg